This is a list of examples where an asteroid or meteoroid travels close to the Earth. Some are regarded as potentially hazardous objects if they are estimated to be large enough to cause regional devastation.

Near-Earth object detection technology began to improve around 1998, so objects being detected as of 2004 could have been missed only a decade earlier due to a lack of dedicated near-Earth astronomical surveys. As sky surveys improve, smaller and smaller asteroids are regularly being discovered. The small near-Earth asteroids , 2014 AA, 2018 LA, 2019 MO and 2022 EB5 are the only five asteroids discovered before impacting into Earth (see asteroid impact prediction). Scientists estimate that several dozen asteroids in the  size range fly by Earth at a distance closer than the moon every year, but only a fraction of these are actually detected. See also lists dedicated to specific years such as List of asteroid close approaches to Earth in 2023.

Timeline of approaches within one lunar distance
Below are lists of close approaches less than one LD for a given year. (See also near-Earth asteroids and NEO Earth Close Approaches.)

Closest per year

From the list in the first section, these are the closest-known asteroids per year that approach Earth within one lunar distance. More than one asteroid per year may be listed if its geocentric distance is within a tenth of the lunar distance, or 0.10 LD.

The table shows that the years 2016 and 2017 had a total of 13 such close encounters that are known. Of these, eight were undetected until after they'd happened and only one was detected with more than 24 hours' notice. 2018 has fared better so far, with six out of the eight known close encounters being detected beforehand, albeit with less than 24 hours' notice in most cases.

This list does not include any of the hundreds of objects that collided with Earth, which were not discovered in advance, but were recorded by sensors designed to detect detonation of nuclear devices. Of the objects so detected, 78 had an impact energy greater than that of a 1-kiloton device (equivalent to 1,000 tons of TNT), including 11 which had an impact energy greater than that of a 10-kiloton device i.e. comparable to the atomic bombs used in the Second World War.

 Rows highlighted red indicate objects which were not discovered until after closest approach

 Rows highlighted yellow indicate objects discovered less than 24 hours before closest approach

 Rows left white indicate objects discovered 1–7 days before closest approach

 Rows highlighted green indicate objects discovered more than one week before closest approach

 Rows highlighted blue indicate objects discovered more than one year before closest approach, i.e. objects successfully cataloged on a previous orbit, rather than being detected during final approach.

A notable case is the relatively large asteroid Duende, which was predicted nearly a year in advance, coincidentally approaching just a few hours after the unrelated Chelyabinsk meteor, which was unpredicted, but injured thousands of people when it impacted.

Largest per year
From the lists in the first section, these are the largest-known asteroids per year that approach Earth within one LD.

The year 2011 was notable as two asteroids with size  or more approached within one lunar distance.

Fastest per year 
The average near-Earth asteroid such as 2019 VF5 passes Earth at 18 km/s, the average short-period comet passes Earth at 30 km/s, and the average long-period comet passes Earth at 53 km/s. A retrograde parabolic Oort cloud comet (e=1, i=180°) could pass Earth at 72 km/s when 1 AU from the Sun.

Passed by outside of atmosphere 

Objects < 50 meters 

Objects > 50 meters 

Asteroids with large uncertainty regions are not included.

* Asteroid approach did not occur during an observed apparition. Passage is calculated by integrating the equations of motion.

** Only the nominal (best-fit) orbit shows a passage this close. The uncertainty region is still somewhat large due to a short observation arc.

Predicted encounters

Incomplete list of asteroids larger than about  predicted to pass close to Earth (see also asteroid impact prediction and Sentry (monitoring system)):

A list of predicted NEO approaches at larger distances is maintained as a database by the NASA Near Earth Object Program.

** Only the nominal (best-fit) orbit shows a passage this close. The uncertainty region is still somewhat large due to a short observation arc.

Earth grazers

Objects which enter and then leave Earth's atmosphere, the so-called 'Earth-grazers', are a distinct phenomenon, in as much as entering the lower atmosphere can constitute an impact event rather than a close pass. Earth grazer can also be short for a body that "grazes" the orbit of the Earth, in a different context.

Animations

Overview

Notes

References

External links
 Sentry Risk TableJet Propulsion Laboratory
 "PHA Close Approaches To The Earth"Minor Planet Center
 "NEO Earth Close Approaches"NASA/JPL's Near-Earth Object Program Office
 "NEO Earth Close-Approaches" (Between 1900 A.D. and 2200 A.D., NEOs with H <=22, nominal distance within 5 LD)NASA/JPL's Near-Earth Object Program Office
 "Near Earth Asteroids (NEAs): A Chronology of Milestones"International Astronomical Union
 NEODyS-2Near Earth Objects Dynamic Site sponsored by ESA
 TECA Table of asteroids next close approaches to the EarthSormano Astronomical Observatory
 SAEL Small Asteroids Encounter ListSormano Astronomical Observatory
 
 E.A.R.N.European Asteroid Research Node
 Upcoming Close Approaches (< 0.10 AU) of NEOs to the Inner Planets - Andrew Lowe using Solex 11
 Earth's Busy NeighborhoodHohmannTransfer
 

 
Near-Earth asteroids
Planetary defense